Savitaben Girdharlal Mayachand Shiroiya Senior Secondary School (commonly known as S.G.M. Shiroiya School, S.G.M. School or Shiroiya English School) is a school in Navsari in the Indian state of Gujarat. It was established in 1996. It is affiliated to C.B.S.E. It is an ISO 9000:2000 certified school and is situated in the Chhapra road area of Navsari near Chhapra Village (located south of Navsari City). It has grade from Nursery to Std. 12 Commerce stream & Science stream. CBSE 10th and 12th Board examination are held annually for SSC and HSC students.

High schools and secondary schools in Gujarat
Education in Navsari district